Abshar is Persian word meaning Waterfall. It may refer to various locations with similar name:
Abshar, Afghanistan
Abshar, Iran
Abshar Rural District, in Iran